The Norrland Engineer Battalion, designation Ingbat/I 19, originally Boden Engineer Regiment, designation Ing 3, was a Swedish Army engineer unit, one of the few new formations raised in the 20th century. It was disbanded in 2005. The unit was garrisoned in Boden, Sweden.

History 
The unit has its origins in the engineer companies created at Norrbotten Regiment in 1902. These companies became independent in 1904 as Boden Engineer Corps and gained the designation Ing 4 (4th Engineer Regiment). Boden Engineer Corps gained the new designation Ing 3 in 1937 and was upgraded to a regiment in 1975 and was renamed Boden Engineer Regiment.

It was then downgraded to a battalion unit again in 1994, and was renamed Norrland Engineer Corps. In 2000, the battalion became one of five battalions in Norrbotten Regiment, with the name Norrland Engineer Battalion, the designation Ing 3 was not kept, even though it was still in common use. The battalion was disbanded in 2005.

Campaigns 
None

Organisation 
?

Heraldry and traditions

Colours, standards and guidons
At the 300th anniversary of the Fortifikationen ("Royal Engineers") on 26 September 1935, His Majesty the King Gustav V presented a colour to the then Boden Engineer Corps. On 1 January 1998, the colour of Svea Engineer Corps was transferred to Norrland Engineer Corps after Svea Engineer Corps was disbanded on 31 December 1997. A new colour was presented to the then Norrland Engineer Battalion in Boden by His Majesty the King Carl XVI Gustaf on 27 August 2001. It was drawn by Kristina Holmgård-Åkerberg and embroidered by machine and hand (the badge) in insertion technique by the company Libraria. The colour may be used according to the decisions of CO I 19. Blazon: "On blue cloth in the centre the lesser coat of arms of Sweden, three yellow crowns placed two and one. In the first corner a mullet with a cluster of rays, all in yellow. In the lower part of this the coat of arms of the unit; argent, throughout a wall with a gatetower both embattled gules (the original name of the battalion was Royal Boden Engineers Regiment, Ing 3); on a chief azure three open crowns in fess or (a legacy from the former Svea Engineer Regiment, Ing 1). The shield ensigned with a royal crown proper. After the battalion was disbanded, the colour was carried by Norrland Engineer Company at Norrbotten Regiment until the company was disbanded on 21 June 2011.

Coat of arms
The coat of the arms of the Boden Engineer Regiment (Ing 3) 1977–1994, the Norrland Engineer Corps (Ing 3) 1994–2000 and the Norrland Engineer Battalion (Ingbat/I 19) 2000–2004. Blazon: "Argent, the town badge of Boden, a wall throughout embattled gules with a gatetower, mansoned in the first colour. The shield surmounted a cluster of rays coming down from a mullet, or".

Medals
Prior to the disbandment on 30 June 2000, the Norrlands ingenjörkårs (Ing 3) minnesmedalj ("Norrland Engineer Corps (Ing 3) Commemorative Medal") in silver (NorrlingSMM) of the 8th size was established. The medal ribbon was divided in black, blue and black moiré. Prior to the disbandment of the battalion on 26 August 2005, the Norrlands ingenjörbataljons minnesmedalj ("Norrland Engineer Battalion Commemorative Medal") in silver (NorrlingbatMSM) of the 8th size was established. The medal ribbon was black with blue edges followed by a yellow stripe.

Commanding officers
Regimental commander as well as battalion and corps commander from 1905 to 2005. Commanding officers from 1905 to 1973 and from 1994 to 2000 were called "corps commander".  Commanding officers from 1973 to 1994 were called "regimental commander" and from 2000 to 2005 the commanding officers were called "battalion commander".

1905–1907: Emil Sebastian von Krusenstjerna 
1907–1914: Olof Kullberg 
1914–1916: Henri Leopold de Champs 
1916–1920: Axel Norinder 
1920–1926: Per Albin Dihlström 
1926–1928: Ove Sylvan
1928–1931: Sven Alin
1931–1934: Ebbe Tydén 
1934–1937: Gunnar Ström 
1937–1940: Åke Grönhagen 
1940–1941: Inge Hellgren 
1941–1941: Anders Walter Graûmann 
1941–1948: Wilhelm Dahlgren 
1948–1953: Stig Berggren
1953–1959: Nils Rabe
1959–1973: Tore Rahmqvist
1973–1979: Owe Karl-Gösta Dahl 
1979–1982: Hans Carlsson
1982–1983: Karl Oskar Sigurd Henningsson (acting)
1983–1991: Karl Oscar Bertil Alm 
1991–1993: Sören Stegius
1994–1994: Anders Andersson (acting)
1994–1996: Jan-Gunnar Isberg
1996–1998: Bo Sören Ericson 
1998–2000: Gunnar Söderström 
2000–2002: Roger Olsson 
2002–2004: Anders Widuss
2004–2005: Björn Sundström

Names, designations and locations

See also
List of Swedish engineer regiments

Footnotes

References

Notes

Print

Further reading

Engineer battalions of the Swedish Army
Disbanded units and formations of Sweden
Military units and formations established in 1905
Military units and formations disestablished in 2004
1905 establishments in Sweden
2004 disestablishments in Sweden
Boden Garrison